Gérard Brach (23 July 1927 – 9 September 2006) was a French screenwriter best known for his collaborations with the film directors Roman Polanski and Jean-Jacques Annaud. He directed two movies: La Maison and The Boat on the Grass.

Personal life and death 
He died of heart failure on 9 September 2006 in Paris, France at age of 79.

Works include

1965: Repulsion (Writer)
1966: Cul-de-sac (Writer)
1967: Le Bal des vampires (UK: Dance of the Vampires; US: The Fearless Vampire Killers) (Writer)
1967: The Two of Us (Le vieil homme et l'enfant) (Writer)
1968: Wonderwall (Story)
1970: La Maison (Director and writer)
1971: Le Bateau sur l'herbe (The Boat on the Grass) (Director and co-writer)
1972: Quoi ? (What?) (Writer)
1976: Le Locataire (The Tenant) (Writer)
1978: Rêve de singe (Bye Bye Monkey) (Writer)
1979: Tess (Writer)
1979: Seeking Asylum (Writer)
1981: Quest for Fire (Original title: La Guerre du feu) (Writer)
1982: Identification of a Woman (Writer)
1983: My Best Friend's Girl (Writer)
1984: Maria's Lovers (Writer)
1986: Pirates (Writer)
1986: Jean de Florette (Writer)
1986: The Name of the Rose (Writer)
1986: Manon des Sources (US title: Manon of the Spring) (Writer)
1987: Shy People (Writer)
1988: Frantic (Writer)
1988: L'Ours (The Bear) (Writer)
1992: Bitter Moon (Writer)
1992: The Lover (Writer)
2004: Blueberry (Writer)
2007: His Majesty Minor (Writer)

Actor
1960: Breathless'' - Photographer (uncredited)

References

External links
 

1927 births
2006 deaths
People from Montrouge
Best Adapted Screenplay BAFTA Award winners
French film directors
20th-century French non-fiction writers
20th-century French male writers
Deaths from cancer in France
Burials at Montparnasse Cemetery
20th-century screenwriters